The Loves of Carmen is a 1927 American silent romantic drama film directed by Raoul Walsh. The film, based on the novella Carmen by Prosper Mérimée, stars Dolores del Río in the title role, and Don Alvarado as Jose.  The film was restored by the Museum of Modern Art and The Film Foundation.

Cast
 Dolores del Río as Carmen
 Don Alvarado as Jose
 Victor McLaglen as Escamillo
 Mathilde Comont as Emilia
 Fred Kohler as Gypsy Chief
 Nancy Nash as Michaela
 Jack Baston as Morales
 Carmen Costello as Teresa
 Rafael Valverde as Miguel

External links
 
 

1927 films
1927 romantic drama films
American romantic drama films
American silent feature films
American black-and-white films
Films based on short fiction
Films based on Carmen
Romantic period films
Fox Film films
Films set in the 19th century
Films set in Spain
Films directed by Raoul Walsh
Films about Romani people
Bullfighting films
1920s American films
Silent romantic drama films
Silent American drama films